Lee Edward Ohanion (born February 24, 1957) is an American economist, columnist, and author known for his work regarding the Great Depression and monetary policy. He is a distinguished professor of economics at the University of California, Los Angeles and serves as a senior fellow at the Hoover Institution of Stanford University. Ohanion previously taught at the University of Minnesota, the University of Pennsylvania, the Stockholm School of Economics, and was a consultant to the Federal Reserve Bank of Minneapolis. He has written for The Wall Street Journal, Forbes, and Newsweek, among other periodicals.

Early life and education 
Ohanion was born in Los Angeles, California. He matriculated at the University of California, Santa Barbara, graduating in 1979 with an undergraduate degree in economics, summa cum laude, and going on to earn a master's degree from the University of Rochester. After earning his degree, Ohanion pursued a career as a business economist, becoming the vice-president of Security Pacific Bank. In 1988, he returned to the University of Rochester on a Wallis fellowship to complete a PhD in economics. In his dissertation, "The Macroeconomic Effects of War Finance in the US: World War II and the Korean War" published in the American Economic Review while he was a professor at the University of Minnesota, Ohanion examined the macroeconomics of war finance.

Academic career 
Upon completing his dissertation, Ohanion joined the faculty of the University of Pennsylvania, teaching there for three years before becoming an associate professor of economics at the University of Minnesota. In 1999, he joined the economics faculty of the University of California, Los Angeles where, between 2000 and 2004, he became vice-chair of its economics department. Throughout his career, Ohanion served as an advisor to multiple Federal Reserve banks, foreign Central banks, and the National Science Foundation.

He is a research associate at the National Bureau of Economic Research, where he is co-director of its "Macroeconomics across Time and Space" program.

See also 
 Hoover Institution

References

External links 
 Website

University of California, Los Angeles faculty
University of California, Santa Barbara alumni
University of Rochester alumni
1957 births
Living people
American economists